Majed Al Haj (born 6 April 1985 in Damascus, Syria) is a Syrian footballer. He currently plays for Al-Wahda. He plays as a striker.

Club career
On 8 August 2014, Al Haj scored the only goal in a 1–0 win over Al-Jaish in the Championship Final Match, to grant his team Al-Wahda their second league title after 2004.

International career
Al Haj was a part of the Syrian U-19 national team that finished in Fourth place at the 2004 AFC U-19 Championship in Malaysia and he was a part of the Syrian U-20 national team at the 2005 FIFA U-20 World Cup in the Netherlands. He plays against Canada, Italy and Colombia in the group-stage of the FIFA U-20 World Cup and against Brazil in the Round of 16. He scored one goal against Canada in the first match of the group-stage.

International goals
Scores and results table. Syria's goal tally first:

Honours

Club
Al-Jaish
Syrian Premier League: 2002–03, 2009–10
Syrian Cup: 2002–03
AFC Cup: 2004

National team
AFC U-19 Championship 2004: Fourth place
FIFA U-20 World Cup 2005: Round of 16
West Asian Games 2005: Runner-up

References

External links

1985 births
Living people
Sportspeople from Damascus
Association football forwards
Syrian footballers
Syria international footballers
Al-Jaish Damascus players
Al-Wahda SC (Syria) players
Syrian expatriate footballers
Expatriate footballers in Jordan
Syrian expatriate sportspeople in Jordan
Syrian Premier League players